The 2018 Changchun Yatai F.C. season is Changchun's 13th consecutive season in the Chinese Super League. Changchun will also be competing in the Chinese FA Cup. This season Yatai moved back to Changchun Stadium, where they won their first league title in 2007, as the club's home ground, after spending 9 seasons at Development Area Stadium.

On 11 November, Yatai suffered shock relegation after losing 0-2 to Dalian Yifang as they have gone through almost the entire season with being considered as completely safe. They got 32 points this season, the joint highest from a relegated team of CSL history, together with Zhejiang Greentown in 2016; They scored 45 goals, which is the highest of all relegated teams in a single season of CSL history. Star player and captain Odion Ighalo scored 21 goals in this campaign, which is second highest of the season, and also the highest of any player from a relegated team in a single season of CSL history.

Players

First team squad

Competitions

Chinese Super League

League table

Results summary

Results

Chinese FA Cup

References

See also 
 2018 Chinese Super League

Chinese football clubs 2018 season